Tony Conyers (30 June 1928 – 25 September 2011) was a British journalist working for the Daily Telegraph and Daily Mirror.  He covered Moscow and Paris for a number of years for the Telegraph.

Footnotes

1928 births
2011 deaths
British male journalists
The Daily Telegraph people
Daily Mirror people
20th-century English businesspeople